Adam Wonus was born in Ohio and now resides in Orlando, Florida. He graduated from Ohio University. He is a real estate developer and is known for his redevelopment of the Milk District in Orlando, Florida. He is the largest landlord in the Milk District, the eastern central district just north of downtown Orlando. The Milk District is famous for the T.G. Lee Milk plant that was established in 1925. According to the Orlando Sentinel, he has built over 60 townhouse units in the downtown Orlando area. He has been interviewed on Fox News Orlando, The Orlando Sentinel as well as NPR.  Wonus's property management company Atrium Management was also awarded the Community Impact honor in the Orlando Business Journal's 2017 Residential Real Estate Awards for the Milk District revitalization efforts.

References

Living people
Year of birth missing (living people)
Ohio University alumni
People from Orlando, Florida
American real estate businesspeople
American landlords